Pesaro is a city and comune in the Italian region of Marche, capital of the Province of Pesaro e Urbino, on the Adriatic Sea. According to the 2011 census, its population was 95,011, making it the second most populous city in the Marche, after Ancona. Pesaro was dubbed the "Cycling City" (Città della Bicicletta) by the Italian environmentalist association Legambiente in recognition of its extensive network of bicycle paths and promotion of cycling. It is also known as "City of Music", for it is the birthplace of the composer Gioacchino Rossini. In 2015 the Italian Government applied for Pesaro to be declared a "Creative City" in UNESCO's World Heritage Sites. In 2017 Pesaro received the European City of Sport award together with Aosta, Cagliari and Vicenza.

Local industries include fishing, furniture making and tourism.

In 2020 it absorbed the former comune of Monteciccardo, now a frazione of Pesaro.

History
The city was established as Pisaurum by the Romans in 184 BC as a colony in the territory of the Picentes, the people who lived along the northeast coast during the Iron Age. In 1737, fourteen ancient votive stones were unearthed in a local farm field, each bearing the inscription of a Roman god; these were written in a pre-Etruscan script, indicating a much earlier occupation of the area than the 184 BC Picentes colony.

A settlement of the Picentes tribe has been found at Novilara. The northern Picentes were invaded in the 4th century BC by the Gallic Senones, earlier by the Etruscans, and when the Romans reached the area the population was an ethnic mixture. The Roman separated and expelled the Gauls from the country.

Under the Roman administration Pesaro, a hub across the Via Flaminia, became an important centre of trading and craftmanship. After the fall of the Western Empire, Pesaro was occupied by the Ostrogoths, and destroyed by Vitigis (539) in the course of the Gothic War. Hastily rebuilt five years later after the Byzantine reconquest, it formed the so-called Pentapolis, part of the Exarchate of Ravenna. After the Lombard and Frankish conquests of that city, Pesaro became part of the Papal States.

During the Renaissance it was ruled successively by the houses of Montefeltro (1285–1445), Sforza (1445–1512) and Della Rovere (1513–1631). Under the last family, who selected it as capital of their duchy, Pesaro saw its most flourishing age, with the construction of numerous public and private palaces, and the erection of a new line of walls (the Mura Roveresche). In 1475, a legendary wedding took place in Pesaro, when Costanzo Sforza and Camilla d'Aragona married.

On 11 September 1860 Piedmontese troops entered the city, and Pesaro was subsequently annexed to the new Kingdom of Italy (see also Battle of Castelfidardo).

Government

Main sights

Buildings and museums
 Ducal Palace (15th century): Commissioned by Alessandro Sforza, the façade has a portico with six arcades supported by six heavy pilasters and an upper floor with five windows crowned by coats of arms, festoons and puttoes.
 Rocca Costanza (15th century): Massive castle built by Costanzo I Sforza; it has a square plan with four cylindrical corner towers and a wide dry moat. Later used as prison.
 Villa Imperiale of Pesaro (c. 1530): Suburban palace with gardens designed by Girolamo Genga for Duke Francesco Maria Della Rovere and his duchess Eleanora and built from c. 1530 onwards, stands atop the San Bartolo hill. Its sunken court is the direct precedent for the more famous one at the Roman Villa Giulia. Rooms are frescoed by prominent Mannerist painters Bronzino, Francesco Menzocchi, Girolamo Genga, and Raffaellino del Colle.
 Mura Roveresche (17th century): "Della Rovere Walls", demolished in the early 20th century), only two gates, Porta del Ponte and Porta Rimini, and a short section remain.
 Birthplace of Gioachino Rossini: Now a museum dedicated to the composer, located at 34 Via Rossini. It has a museum  with manifestos, prints, portraits and his spinet.
 Conservatorio Statale di Musica Gioachino Rossini: Located in the 18th century Palazzo Olivieri–Machirelli on the Piazza Oliveri.
 Musei Civici di Palazzo Mosca: Civic museum which contains mainly paintings and ceramics. Among the art is the Pesaro Altarpiece by Giovanni Bellini.
 Oliveriano Archeologic Museum and Oliveriana Library: Archaeological Collection and Manuscript Library; founded in 1756 by Annibale degli Abati Olivieri.

Churches and other religious buildings
Pesaro Cathedral (5th-14th centuries) Romanesque-Gothic Basilica built over remains of a late Roman edifice and dedicated to St Terence during the Middle Ages. The façade, in Romanesque-Gothic style, is unfinished: it has a simple ogival portal surmounted by a band of small arches. A recent restoration has brought to light floor mosaics.
The Baroque Sanctuary of Beata Vergine del Carmelo (18th century).
Church of the Maternità
Santissima Annunziata
Oratory of the Nome di Dio  
San Giacomo   
San Giovanni Battista   
Sant'Agostino   
Santa Lucia   
Municipal Chapel of Sant'Ubaldo  
Church and Convent of the Girolimini   
Madonna del Porto  
Santa Maria delle Grazie  
Pieve di Ginestreto   
Pieve di Santo Stefano   
Santa Veneranda
Sacred Grove of Lucus Pisaurensis, pre-Roman era sacerdotal lucus

Cultural events and attractions

The Pesaro film festival (Mostra Internazionale del Nuovo Cinema) has taken place in Pesaro since 1965.
Rossini Opera Festival has taken place every summer since 1980 in Pesaro, home as well as the Conservatorio Statale di Musica "Gioachino Rossini" founded with a legacy from the composer.
Pesaro hosts the home games of Victoria Libertas basketball team, better known across Europe as Scavolini Pesaro.
 Adriatic Arena: third biggest Italian indoor arena behind Mediolanum Forum in Milan and PalaLottomatica in Rome.

Notable people
 
 
 Anna Maria Alberghetti (born 1936), singer and actress
 Massimo Ambrosini (born 1977), footballer
 Pasquale Bini (1716–1770), violinist
 Antonello Bonci, neuroscientist
 Francesco Braschi (born 2004), racing driver
 Roberto Burioni, physician and professor of microbiology and virology
 Matilde Leonardi, neurologist and paediatrician
 Filippo Magnini (born 1982), swimmer
 Gianni Morbidelli, Formula One driver
 Cristiano Mozzati, drummer for Lacuna Coil
 Luca Nardi, professional tennis player
 Riz Ortolani (1926–2014), film composer
 Angelo Romani (1934–2003), Olympic swimmer
 Graziano Rossi (born 1954), motorcycle racer and father of Valentino Rossi
 Gioachino Antonio Rossini (1792–1868), composer
 Giovanni Sforza, condottiero and first husband of Lucrezia Borgia
 Renata Tebaldi, operatic soprano
 Giuseppe Vaccai (1836-1912), painter

International relations

Twin towns – sister cities
Pesaro is twinned with:

 Nanterre, France
 Ljubljana, Slovenia
 Watford, United Kingdom
 Qinhuangdao, China
 Rafah, Palestine
 Keita, Niger
 Reșița, Romania
 Kakegawa, Japan

Partnership
 Rovinj, Croatia

See also

Pesaro railway station
Alessandro Sforza
Lucus Pisaurensis
Votive Stones of Pesaro
Costanzo Sforza
Romagna
Pesaro Angels

References

External links

Official website

 
Coastal towns in the Marche
Duchy of the Pentapolis
Roman sites of the Marche
184 BC
180s BC establishments
Populated places established in the 2nd century BC
Castles in Italy